Franklin Hogan (November 26, 1842 – March 29, 1933) was a decorated hero of the Union Army in the American Civil War. He was born in York, Pennsylvania and lived in Adrian, Michigan.

War service
Hogan mustered in as a Corporal in Company A, 45th Pennsylvania Volunteer Infantry Regiment on August 16, 1861.

According to the Military Times Hall of Valor, on 30 July 1863, while serving with Company A, 45th Pennsylvania Infantry Regiment, in action at Petersburg, Virginia, the 45th charged into the huge crater caused by Union forces exploding tons of gunpowder under Confederate lines. In A. P. Hill's counterattack, the color-bearer of the 6th Virginia Infantry attempted to plant the regiment's battleflag at the top of the crater's parapet. Corporal Hogan shot him down and seized the colors of the 6th Virginia in Mahone's Virginia Brigade in Anderson's Division in Hill's III Corps.

Rank and organization: Corporal, Company A, 45th Pennsylvania Volunteer Infantry Regiment. Place and date: At Petersburg, VA., July 30, 1864

Citation:

The President of the United States of America, in the name of Congress, takes pleasure in presenting the Medal of Honor to Corporal Franklin Hogan, United States Army, for extraordinary heroism on 30 July 1864, while serving with Company A, 45th Pennsylvania Infantry, in action at Petersburg, Virginia, for capture of flag of 6th Virginia Infantry (Confederate States of America).

Franklin Hogan received his medal on October 1, 1864. Hogan honorably mustered out when his enlistment expired twenty days later on October 20, 1864.

Post war
Franklin Hogan returned to York and married Elizabeth Patterson (1851-1931). They had two sons who were both born in Pennsylvania: Edward A Hogan (1872–1929) and Harry D Hogan (1878–1943). At some time after the war, the family moved to Hutchinson, Kansas where Hogan had a farm and worked for the Kansas Salt Company.

See also
45th Pennsylvania Infantry Regiment
List of Medal of Honor recipients
List of American Civil War Medal of Honor recipients: G–L

Notes

References

External links
 45th Pennsylvania monument at Antietam Battlefield

1843 births
1932 deaths
Union Army soldiers
United States Army Medal of Honor recipients
American Civil War recipients of the Medal of Honor
People from Pennsylvania
People from York, Pennsylvania